Maranatha College was a seventh-day Sabbatarian Bible college located in Meridian, Idaho. Maranatha College's name derives from the New Testament phrase maranatha, meaning "behold, the Lord is coming" (1 Corinthians 16:22). The college described itself on its homepage as "a regionally accredited, fundamental Baptist college, which requires a Bible core and broad liberal arts emphasis for every major."

In 2004, Maranatha launched an online studies program that allowed students the opportunity to earn a Certificate of Ministry through distance learning methods. Currently, Maranatha College has students from the United States, Canada, Europe, Africa, and the Caribbean Islands. In 2005, Maranatha College held its first regional classes in Michigan, Missouri, and Idaho, sponsored a mission trip to Mexico, and opened an extension campus in Ghana, Africa.

Its faculty consisted of theologians as well as veteran pastors. Maranatha College was administered by the General Council Churches of God, 7th Day (not to be confused with General Conference of the Church of God (Seventh-Day)).

The college is now inactive. Its website was last online in 2013.

External links
Maranatha College's former website
General Council Church Of God 7th Day

References 

Defunct private universities and colleges in Idaho
Bible colleges
Buildings and structures in Ada County, Idaho
Education in Ada County, Idaho
Meridian, Idaho